Water polo was contested for men only at the 1946 Central American and Caribbean Games in Barranquilla, Colombia.

References
 

1946 Central American and Caribbean Games
1946
1946 in water polo